Nsana Claudélion Etienne Simon (born 11 March 2000) is a French professional footballer who plays as a midfielder for Slovenian club Bravo.

Club career
On 30 March 2018, Simon signed his first professional contract with RC Lens. On 30 January 2021, Simon signed with St. Gallen in the Swiss Super League. He made his debut with St. Gallen in a 4–3 Swiss Super League loss to FC Lausanne-Sport on 20 March 2021.

References

External links
 
 FFF Profile

2000 births
Living people
Footballers from Seine-Saint-Denis
French footballers
France youth international footballers
French sportspeople of Democratic Republic of the Congo descent
Association football midfielders
Cergy Pontoise FC players
RC Lens players
FC St. Gallen players
NK Bravo players
Championnat National 2 players
Swiss Super League players
Slovenian PrvaLiga players
French expatriate footballers
French expatriate sportspeople in Switzerland
Expatriate footballers in Switzerland
French expatriate sportspeople in Slovenia
Expatriate footballers in Slovenia
Black French sportspeople